Qayqu (Quechua for a type of hunt, hispanicized spelling Jaico) is a mountain in the Paryaqaqa mountain range in the Andes of Peru, about  high. It is situated in the Junín Region, Yauli Province, on the border of the districts of Suitucancha and Yauli. Qayqu lies north of Putka and southeast of Uqhu.

References

Mountains of Peru
Mountains of Junín Region